Jennifer Louise "Jenny" Orr (later McConnell, later Frank, born 21 January 1953) is a retired Australian middle-distance runner. She competed in the 800 m and 1500 m events at the 1972 Summer Olympics and placed eighth over 1500 m. Her son Daniel McConnell became an Olympic mountain biker.

References

1953 births
Living people
Olympic athletes of Australia
Athletes (track and field) at the 1972 Summer Olympics
Australian female middle-distance runners